A home page (or homepage) is the main web page of a website. The term may also refer to the start page shown in a web browser when the application first opens. Usually, the home page is located at the root of the website's domain or subdomain. For example, if the domain is example.com, the home page is likely located at www.example.com/.

Function 
A home page is the primary web page that a visitor will view when they navigate to a website via a search engine, and it may also function as a landing page to attract visitors. In some cases, the home page is a site directory, particularly when a website has multiple home pages.

Good home page design is usually a high priority for a website; for example, a news website may curate headlines and first paragraphs of top stories, with links to full articles. According to Homepage Usability, the homepage is the "most important page on any website" and receives the most views of any page. A poorly designed home page can overwhelm and deter visitors from the site. One important use of home pages is communicating the identity and value of a company.

Elements 
A homepage is oftentimes designed to catch attention, and as such, important elements are positioned at the top in a strict hierarchy of importance. Curating which content to display on a homepage, as to not overwhelm visitors, is important to a well-designed page.

Hero image 
One of the commonly found aspects of a homepage is a hero image, a large eye-catching banner image often containing a photograph or drawing depicting the webpage owner's values, services, etc. as a message. Hero images are immediately visible above the fold, without scrolling the page down. A hero image may have several complementary elements as an overlay, such as the website's logo, a call to action, and a brief description.

Carousel 
A descendant of the hero image is a carousel, also known as a slider. It is a slideshow-like element of the homepage with multiple images rotating every few seconds. Carousels are frequently accompanied by dots and buttons in order to select different images. Carousels are generally made using JavaScript but can also be made through CSS animations. In 2013, carousels were a popular element of a homepage, with 52% of top e-commerce websites using the design feature. However, in 2016 only 32% of websites used one.

See also 

 Contact page
 Site map

References

Bibliography

Web design